David William Farrell (born 11 November 1971) is a former footballer. Farrell made over 400 appearances in the Football League for Wycombe Wanderers, Peterborough United and Boston United between 1995 and 2007.

Career
Farrell began his career at non-league club Redditch United in 1991 before joining Aston Villa in 1992 for a fee of £45,000. He made eight league and cup appearances for Aston Villa in three seasons and then joined Wycombe Wanderers for a fee of £100,000, where he made over 70 appearances in all competitions in two seasons. He moved on to Peterborough United in June 1997, where he spent nine seasons, making almost 400 appearances and scored 52 goals, and became a London Road legend. He was not offered a new contract at the end of the 2005–06 season, due to the manager wanting someone younger, and left the club, joining Boston United in June 2006, where he made 43 appearances during the 2006–07 season as Boston were ultimately relegated from the Football League in May 2007.

After one season at Boston, Farrell joined Conference National side Burton Albion in July 2007. He was released by Burton after his one-year contract expired at the end of the 2007–08 season and re-joined Boston United, now in the Northern Premier League Premier Division, in June 2008.

Career statistics
This table is incomplete.

Notes
A.  The "Other" column constitutes appearances and goals in the Football League Trophy unless stated. In 1999/00 the data relates to the Football League play-offs.
B.  The season summary source wrongly lists Farrell as scoring two goals in 'Other competitions'. This is proved to be incorrect by analysis of Peterborough's games/scorers for that season

Honours
Individual
PFA Team of the Year: 1997–98 Third Division

References

External links

Profile at UpThePosh! The Peterborough United Database

1971 births
Living people
Footballers from Birmingham, West Midlands
English footballers
Association football midfielders
Redditch United F.C. players
Aston Villa F.C. players
Scunthorpe United F.C. players
Wycombe Wanderers F.C. players
Peterborough United F.C. players
Boston United F.C. players
Burton Albion F.C. players
Stamford A.F.C. players
Premier League players
English Football League players
National League (English football) players
Northern Premier League players
Swindon Town F.C. non-playing staff